Mohammad Yunus (4 July 1944 – 27 March 2021) was a politician of Bangladesh Nationalist Party and then MP of Comilla-14 and Comilla-5 constituencies.

Birth and early life 
Yunus was born on 4 July 1944 in Gobinath village of Piryatrapur union in Burichang upazila of Comilla district.

Career 
Yunus was the organizer of the liberation war. He played an active role in all the political activities of the time including the 6-point movement, language movement and participation in the war of independence of Bangladesh.

In the first parliamentary elections of 1973, he won the then Comilla-14 seat as a candidate of the Bangladesh Awami League.

As a candidate of Jatiya Party, he won the third Jatiya Sangsad election of 1986 and the fourth Jatiya Sangsad of 1988 from Comilla-5 constituency.

He was elected a Member of Parliament from the Bangladesh Nationalist Party in the 8th Parliamentary Election of 2001.

He was defeated in the fifth national election of 1991 by contesting on behalf of Jatiya Party and in the national election of 2018 by BNP.

Death 
Mohammad Yunus died on 27 March 2021.

References 

1944 births
2021 deaths
People of the Bangladesh Liberation War
Bangladesh Nationalist Party politicians
1st Jatiya Sangsad members
3rd Jatiya Sangsad members
4th Jatiya Sangsad members
8th Jatiya Sangsad members
People from Comilla District